Alfred Bush may refer to:

 Alfred L. Bush (born 1933), American curator, writer, editor, and bibliophile
 Alfred Louis Bush (1849–1902), American industrialist and politician in Los Angeles County, California